Jørn Marumsrud Lande (born May 31, 1968) is a Norwegian hard rock and heavy metal singer and songwriter. He is known for his work with the bands Ark, Beyond Twilight, Millenium, Vagabond, The Snakes, and most notably with power metal band Masterplan. He is also the most recurrent guest singer of the international supergroup Avantasia, and has worked as lead and guest singer in several projects. Currently, he is focusing his activities on his solo project Jorn. In 2014, Lande was hired by Riot Games to be the voice of the character Karthus, of the fictional heavy metal band Pentakill (League of Legends). 

Lande's voice has drawn favorable comparisons to David Coverdale and Ronnie James Dio.

Biography

Vagabond, the Snakes and first projects (1993–1998) 
The first band with whom he achieved a minor success was Vagabond, which also featured Ronni Le Tekrø, Morty Black and other former members of the Norwegian hard rock band TNT. The self titled album, released in 1994, sold 10,000 copies in Norway, but the copies were dropped by label EMI. At this time, Jørn did the lead vocals for the Norway national football team's song for the 1994 World Cup, "Alt for Norge" (All for Norway). The second Vagabond album, A Huge fan of Life, was released in Europe on the band's own record label. The end of Vagabond came with the reformation of TNT in 1996, and subsequently the band members went their separate ways, with Jørn joining a band formed in by Whitesnake former guitarists Bernie Marsden and Micky Moody called the Snakes. After a tour with the Snakes playing mostly Whitesnake covers and the recording of an album released only in Japan called Once Bitten, Jørn was fired from the band and joined other projects, including the Symphonic Metal band Mundanus Imperium, which resulted on the album The Spectral Spheres Coronation.

Ark, Millenium, Beyond Twilight, first solo albums (1999–2001) 
Later on, Jørn got together with guitarist Tore Østby (ex-Conception) and drummer John Macaluso to form the progressive metal band Ark and record their first self titled album in 1999. Right after in 2000, he also made part of the American hard rock band Millenium, led by guitarist Ralph Santolla, and recorded the vocals for their album Hourglass. The same year, John Macaluso from Ark, who was also playing with Yngwie Malmsteen's band, made contact with the guitarist to include Jørn on a mini tour in Europe, as they needed a vocalist for the band. The collaboration between Lande and Malmsteen didn't endure and Jørn left the band in the middle of the tour. Also in the same year, Jørn recorded his first solo album called Starfire, which featured mostly cover songs and several band members from his past and current bands as the musicians of the album.

The second Ark album Burn the Sun was released in 2001 and is one of the most acclaimed works featuring Jørn. Also in 2001, he teamed up with keyboardist Finn Zierler and formed the project Beyond Twilight which led to the album The Devil's Hall of Fame, another acclaimed work by the public and media. Still in the same year, Jørn released his second solo album Worldchanger.

Masterplan, Allen/Lande and other projects (2002–2010) 
In 2002, Jørn joined the melodic power metal band Masterplan, formed with Roland Grapow and Uli Kusch after both were fired from Helloween. Jørn released two successful albums with Masterplan, playing at big festivals and tours around the world from 2003 to 2006 until he left the band on 11 May 2006, because of creative differences. Jørn wanted to take the band towards a more melodic style, while the other members were leaning towards a heavier sound. During the time as member of Masterplan, Jorn also released two solo albums via the band's record label AFM Records: Out to Every Nation in 2004 and The Duke in 2006. After his departure from Masterplan, Jørn concentrated more on his solo career and started a longtime partnership with the record company Frontiers Records.

In 2005, Jørn teamed up with Symphony X vocalist Russell Allen in a singer-duet collaboration on the album The Battle, and their following album, The Revenge, released 11 May 2007. The project is commonly called Allen-Lande and was put together by the president of Frontiers Records, with songwriting duties and most of the instrumentation done by Swedish guitarist Magnus Karlsson.

Jorn's first live album, Live in America, was released 21 September 2007, containing two discs with tracks taken from his performance on 16 September 2006, at the rock festival ProgPower VII in Atlanta, Georgia.

In 2008, Jørn Lande lent his voice to the rock opera bands Ayreon on the album 01011001 and Avantasia on the album The Scarecrow, both released in January 2008. He was also one of the main guests in the first Avantasia's world tour. Later, he was featured on over 10 songs on Avantasia's two subsequent albums, The Wicked Symphony and Angel of Babylon and once again took part in the world tour in December 2010.

Jørn released two more full-length albums with his own band, Lonely Are the Brave in 2008, which was the fastest selling album of his career, and Spirit Black, right one year after.

On 25 July 2009, Masterplan announced that Jørn was back in the band. Masterplan's 3rd album with Jørn Lande is titled Time to Be King and was released on 21 May 2010.

Dio tribute album, Heaven and Hell and Jorn establishment (2010–2013) 
In late May, a Jorn music video honoring legendary heavy metal singer Ronnie James Dio, who had died of stomach cancer just five days before, was posted on YouTube. Soon after it was announced that Jørn would release a Dio tribute album in July. Later on, it was announced that Jørn was included in the line up of Heaven & Hell, when the remaining members played the one off tribute to Ronnie James Dio at the 2010 High Voltage festival. He was one of the vocalists together with Glenn Hughes.

The third Allen/Lande album titled The Showdown has been announced for release in September 2010. To promote the album, Frontiers Records released a videoclip of the song Judgement Day featuring Jørn singing, via YouTube.

In 2011, Jorn released his second live album with footage from the concert of the 2010 Sweden Rock Festival, the album was called Live in Black. Also in 2011, he was a guest on female singer Amanda Somerville's first metal project Trillium singing on the vocal duet track 'Scream It'.

A new Jorn album called Bring Heavy Rock to the Land was released on 1 June 2012 in Europe and 5 June 2012 in North America via Frontiers Records. It has a single for the title track released on 14 May 2012.

In November 2012, the record company AFM Records announced the production of a new Masterplan album with a new line-up, including Rick Altzi (At Vance) replacing Jørn Lande as vocalist.

Jorn's first release for 2013 is called Symphonic, a compilation of previous recordings with classical music arrangement.

On 15 April 2013, it was also announced a new Jorn full-length album called Traveller, which was released in 11 June in North America and 14 June in Europe.

Allen/Lande reformed, Pentakill, Dracula and Return to Avantasia (2013–present) 
Jørn Lande also announced in an interview that a new Allen/Lande album was in the works but this time with songwriting and production made by former Stratovarius guitarist Timo Tolkki, replacing Magnus Karlsson. On 24 July 2013, Timo Tolkki also confirmed the role in the project via his Facebook page. The album The Great Divide was released on 17 October in Europe and 21 October 2014 in North America. This time, Lande has also contributed with some vocal melodies and lyrics to the songs.

In 2014, Lande provided lead vocals for songs Lightbringer and Thornmail for the fictional League of Legends band, Pentakill (named after the rare occurrence of one player defeating all five of the enemy team in quick succession) taking the role of Karthus, a lich that serves as one of the playable characters in the game. The first single, Lightbringer, was released on 27 May, and the full album, Smite and Ignite, was released on 3 June 2014.

The same year, it was announced a project created by Lande together with guitarist Trond Holter (former Wig Wam), an album rock opera based telling the story of Bram Stoker's Dracula. It was released on 23 January in Europe and 27 January 2015 in North America and it's called Swing Of Death. They performed the whole album live on 1 May 2015 at the Karmoygeddon Festival in Norway.

In 2015, Jorn performed live with the fictional League of Legends band Pentakill in São Paulo, Brazil during the CBLOL (League of Legends Brazilian Championship) grand final. He was singing in a duet with the character Karthus (portrayed by Brazilian singer, former Hangar, Nando Fernandes).

The same year, it was announced Jorn's return to the Avantasia crew, recording vocals for the album Ghostlights and taking part in the 2016 world tour.

Jorn was also announced as one of the guests of former Allen/Lande instrumentalist/producer Magnus Karlsson's new album Kingdom of Rock, from his project Free Fall. Jorn sings the first and self-titled track.

In 2016, Jorn announced a new release called Heavy Rock Radio, his third album consisting only of covers songs from artists that inspired him to start a musical career. This time the album would include covers from pop artists such as Kate Bush, Frida, John Farnham and also some rock icons such as Paul Stanley, Queen, Iron Maiden, Journey, Eagles and many more. The album was released on 3 June 2016.

In 2017, a new full length Jorn album with original songs was announced. Called Life On Death Road, its release date is 2 June 2017 and features all musicians from the band Voodoo Circle, except the singer. The same year, he was also invited to sing most of the songs in the second Pentakill album Grasp of the Undying, released on 3 August 2017. He also performed live once again with the band in Brazil during the CBLOL (League of Legends Brazilian Championship) 2017 edition grand final, in the city of Belo Horizonte.

Jorn participated in Melodi Grand Prix 2021 and is attempting to represent Norway in the Eurovision Song Contest 2021 with the song "Faith Bloody Faith". The song did not qualify from Heat 1, however Jorn won the Second Chance round and advanced to the final as the wild card entry- where he made the G old Final before falling to KEiiNO, and TIX, who went on to win with Fallen Angel.

On the 11th of April, 2021, Jørn performed with Pentakill at LCS Mid-Season Showdown, debuting a new song from the band.

Discography

Studio albums

Live albums

Compilation albums

Cover albums

Singles

As band member

As guest vocalist

Embee (Mai Britt) Normann 
 Wonderland (1993), backing vocals

Drillos
 Alt For Norge (single) (1994), Norway national football team's official song for 1994 FIFA World Cup 1994

Dag Kolsrud 
 December II (1991), songs 'Someone To Love', 'Mary Tomorrow' & 'We Wish You A Merry Christmas'
 Got A Mind Set On Gold (single) (1996), song 'A Few Good Men'
 My First Choice (single) (1999)
 Famous (single) (2002), Norway team's official song for the 2002 Olympic Games in Salt Lake City, (English and Norwegian language versions)

Tor Talle 
 Songs from the Heart (1999), songs 'Don't Turn Away' & 'After Love'

Nikolo Kotzev
 Nikolo Kotzev's Nostradamus (2001), as The Inquisitor

Norwegian Gospel Voices 
 Let's Dance (2002), song 'Le Freak'

Brazen Abbot
 Guilty As Sin (2003), songs 'Eyes on the Horizon', 'Mr. Earthman', 'Bring the Colors Home' & 'A Whole Lotta Woman'

Diesel Dahl & Friends
 Happy Birthday Harley Davidson: Tribute To A Legend (2003), song 'Harley Davidson'

Re-Play 
 Re-Pita Mania 2 (2003), song 'Love Don't Bother Me'

Thunderlords
 Fire In The Sky (single) (2005)

Bjørn Øyvind Bya & Jørn Lande 
 Så Er Vi Her Igjen (Cupfinale Låta) (single) (2006)

Ken Hensley
 Blood on the Highway (2007)
 Blood on the Highway – The Exclusive Release Concert (live album) (2008)

Genius – A Rock Opera
 Episode 3: The Final Surprise (2007) as Apikor

Avantasia
 Lost in Space Part I (2007)
 Lost in Space Part II (2007)
 The Scarecrow (2008)
 The Wicked Symphony (2010)
 Angel of Babylon (2010)
 The Flying Opera (live album) (2011)
 Ghostlights (2016)
 Moonglow (2019)
 A Paranormal Evening with the Moonflower Society (2022)

Ayreon
 01011001 (2008)

Olle Johnny Lande
 Tidssignal (2010)

Pushking
 The World As We Love It (2011), song 'Heroin'

Amanda Somerville's Trillium
 Alloy (2011), song 'Scream It'

David Lande
 Take The Wheel (single) – (2013), backing vocals

Pentakill – League of Legends
 Smite And Ignite (2014) as Karthus, songs 'Lightbringer' & 'Thornmail'
 Grasp of the Undying (2017) as Karthus, songs 'The Bloodthirster', 'Cull', 'Mortal Reminder', 'Dead Man's Plate' & 'Frozen Heart'
 Lost Chapter (2021) as Karthus, songs 'Lost Chapter', 'Edge of Night', 'Gathering Storm', 'Executioner's Calling', 'Last Stand', 'Redemption' & 'Lightbringer - Acoustic'

Magnus Karlsson's Free Fall
 Kingdom of Rock (2015), song 'Kingdom of Rock'

Oceans of Time 
 Trust (2016), song 'Grapes of Baccus'

Martin Simson's Destroyer of Death 
 Master of All (single) (2021)

Solo band members

Band members/guests 

Current lineup:
Tore Moren – guitars (Worldchanger, The Duke, Unlocking the Past, The Gathering, Live in America, Lonely Are The Brave, Spirit Black, Dio, Live in Black, Bring Heavy Rock to the Land, Live on Death Road, Heavy Rock Radio II, Over The Horizon Radar, guest on Starfire, additional guitars on Heavy Rock Radio)
Adrian SB - guitars (Over The Horizon Radar)
Francesco Jovino – drums (Heavy Rock Radio, Life On Death Road, Live on Death Road, Heavy Rock Radio II, Over The Horizon Radar)
Alessandro Del Vecchio – keyboards (Heavy Rock Radio, Life On Death Road, Live on Death Road, Heavy Rock Radio II, Over The Horizon Radar)

Former:

Guitars:
Jørn Viggo Lofstad – guitars (Out to Every Nation, The Duke, Unlocking the Past, The Gathering, Live in America, Lonely Are The Brave, additional guitars on Heavy Rock Radio)
Jimmy Iversen – guitars (Spirit Black, Bring Heavy Rock to the Land, Traveller, additional guitars on Heavy Rock Radio)
Trond Holter – guitars (Traveller, Heavy Rock Radio)
Tor Erik Myhre – guitars (Dio, Live in Black)
Alex Beyrodt – guitars (Life On Death Road)
Igor Gianola – guitars (Live, additional guitars on Spirit Black, Dio and Heavy Rock Radio II)
Jon Berg – guitars (additional guitars on Spirit Black)
Tore Østby – guitars (guest on Starfire, Unlocking the Past) 
Ralph Santolla – guitars (guest on Starfire, Unlocking the Past) 
Ronni Le Tekrø – guitars (guest on Starfire, Unlocking the Past) 
Gus G – guitars (guest on Life On Death Road)
Craig Goldy – guitars (guest on Life On Death Road)

Bass:
Sid Ringsby – bass (Worldchanger, Lonely Are The Brave, Spirit Black, Live on Death Road, Heavy Rock Radio II, additional bass on Heavy Rock Radio)
Morty Black – bass (The Duke, The Gathering, Unlocking the Past)
Nic Angileri – bass (Dio, Live in Black, Bring Heavy Rock to the Land, additional bass on Spirit Black and Heavy Rock Radio)
Steinar Krokmo – bass (Live in America, guest on Unlocking the Past)
Thomas Bekkevold – bass (Heavy Rock Radio)
Magnus Rosén – bass (Out to Every Nation)
Bernt Jansen – bass (Traveller)
Mat Sinner – bass (Life On Death Road)
Nik Mazzucconi – bass (Over The Horizon Radar)
Espen Mjöen – bass (additional Bass on Lonely Are The Brave, Spirit Black and Traveller)

Drums:
Willy Bendiksen – drums (The Duke, Unlocking the Past, The Gathering, Live in America, Lonely Are The Brave, Spirit Black, Dio, Live in Black, Bring Heavy Rock to the Land, Traveller, guest on Starfire, additional drums on Heavy Rock Radio)
Stian Kristoffersen – drums (Out to Every Nation, guest on Live in America)
Jan Axel von Blomberg – drums (Worldchanger)
Beata Polak – drums (Live on Death Road)
John Macaluso – drums (Starfire)
Jon A . Narum –  drums, samples, bass, guitars, melotrone (guest on Starfire)
Christian Svendsen – drums (Live)

Keyboards:
Dag Stokke – keyboards (Starfire)
Ronny Tegner – keyboards (Out to Every Nation)
Lasse Jensen – keyboards (additional keyboards on Heavy Rock Radio)
Lasse Finbråten – keyboards (guest on Live in America)

References

External links

 Jørn's official site
 Jørn – Song for Ronnie James Tribute Video

1968 births
Norwegian heavy metal singers
Norwegian male singers
Living people
People from Rjukan
Masterplan (band) members
Allen-Lande members
Heaven & Hell (band) members
Ark (Norwegian band) members
The Snakes (band) members
Yngwie J. Malmsteen's Rising Force members
Frontiers Records artists
AFM Records artists
Candlelight Records artists
Melodi Grand Prix contestants
The Company of Snakes members
Brazen Abbot members